Libris or LIBRIS may refer to:

 Libris Prize, a prize for novels originally written in Dutch
 Libris Award, a prize for Canadian literature
 LIBRIS, a Swedish national union catalogue 
 Libris Mortis, a 2004 book in the Dungeons & Dragons series
 Rex Libris, a science fiction/humor comic book series

See also
 Libri (disambiguation)
 Ex Libris (disambiguation)